Vlatko Čančar (born 10 April 1997) is a Slovenian professional basketball player for the Denver Nuggets of the National Basketball Association (NBA).

Professional career

Union Olimpija (2015–2016) 
On 16 April 2015, Čančar signed a five-year contract with Union Olimpija.

Mega Leks (2016–2018) 
On 30 June 2016, Čančar left Olimpija and signed with Serbian team Mega Leks.

Burgos (2018–2019) 
On 13 June 2018, Čančar signed a two-year deal with Spanish club San Pablo Burgos.

Denver Nuggets (2019–present) 
On 22 June 2017, Čančar was selected with the 49th overall pick in the 2017 NBA draft by the Denver Nuggets.

On 1 August 2019, Čančar signed his rookie contract with the Denver Nuggets.

On 13 May 2021, Čančar scored a career-high 14 points off the bench in a 114–103 win over the Minnesota Timberwolves.

On 3 January 2022, during a 89–103 loss to the Dallas Mavericks, Čančar suffered a right foot injury. Two days later, he was diagnosed with a fracture of his right fifth metatarsal. On 7 January, Čančar underwent surgery for the fracture and was ruled out for at least three months.

On April 10, in the regular season finale Čančar returned to the Nuggets and played a season high 24 minutes in an overtime loss to the Los Angeles Lakers. Čančar recorded 2 points, 8 rebounds, and 4 assists in his last regular season game.

On July 7, 2022, Čančar re-signed with the Nuggets on a three-year deal.

On November 23rd, 2022, Čančar scored a career high 20 points, along with 4 rebounds, 5 assists and 3 blocks in an overtime win against the Oklahoma City Thunder.

National team career
Čančar has been a member of the Slovenia national basketball team. He played with the team at EuroBasket 2017, where he won the gold medal with his country.

Čančar represented the Slovenian national basketball team at the 2020 Summer Olympics in Tokyo, Japan.

Career statistics

NBA

Regular season

|-
| style="text-align:left;"|
| style="text-align:left;"|Denver
| 14 || 0 || 3.2 || .400 || .167 || 1.000 || .7 || .2 || .1 || .1 || 1.2
|-
| style="text-align:left;"|
| style="text-align:left;"|Denver
| 41 || 1 || 6.9 || .458 || .273 || .769 || 1.2 || .3 || .3 || .0 || 2.1
|-
| style="text-align:left;"|
| style="text-align:left;"|Denver
| 15 || 1 || 11.7 || .561 || .583 || .643 || 2.1 || 1.1 || .1 || .2 || 4.1
|- class="sortbottom"
| style="text-align:center;" colspan="2"| Career
| 70 || 2 || 7.2 || .484 || .333 || .742 || 1.3 || .5 || .2 || .1 || 2.3

Playoffs

|-
| style="text-align:left;"|2021
| style="text-align:left;"|Denver
| 5 || 0 || 4.2 || 1.000 || 1.000 || .800 || .6 || .2 || .2 || .2 || 2.2
|-
| style="text-align:left;"|2022
| style="text-align:left;"|Denver
| 2 || 0 || 4.5 || .667 || .500 || — || 1.0 || .5 || .0 || .0 || 2.5
|- class="sortbottom"
| style="text-align:center;" colspan="2"| Career
| 7 || 0 || 4.3 || .833 || .667 || .800 || .7 || .3 || .1 || .1 || 2.3

See also
 List of NBA drafted players from Serbia

References

External links
Union Olimpija Profile
Eurobasket.com profile

1997 births
Living people
ABA League players
Basketball players at the 2020 Summer Olympics
CB Miraflores players
Denver Nuggets draft picks
Denver Nuggets players
Erie BayHawks (2019–2021) players
Grand Rapids Gold players
FIBA EuroBasket-winning players
KK Mega Basket players
KK Olimpija players
Liga ACB players
National Basketball Association players from Slovenia
Olympic basketball players of Slovenia
Slovenian expatriate basketball people in Serbia
Slovenian expatriate basketball people in Spain
Slovenian expatriate basketball people in the United States
Slovenian men's basketball players
Small forwards
Sportspeople from Koper